The Ahvaz Ghadir Stadium is a new multi-use stadium in Ahvaz, Iran, has a capacity of 38,900 people.

Background
In 1974, Zohreh Malileh Farshid, one of Iran's first and youngest female architects designed the Ahvaz Sports Complex. Her wish was to have it ready for Ahvaz to host the 1984 Summer Olympics.

The building progress of the complex was ready to start in November 1978 but after the victory of Iranian Revolution in 1979 and start of the Iran–Iraq War in 1981, the building progress was cancelled. After the end of the war in 1989, Ahvaz's then mayor, Mohammad Hossein Adeli was announced that the building of the complex will be started in February 1992. The building of futsall and volleyball venues was started in 1992 and the venues was opened in 1998. Basketball and handball venues was also opened in 2002.

The progress of the building of football venue was started on 2 February 2006 after an official visit of President Mahmoud Ahmadinejad. The stadium itself was completed in early 2012 after 6 years of construction. Although the stadium was planned with a capacity of 51,000 seats, the final capacity is only 38,900.

Environmental compatibility
 Reductions of greenhouse gases
 No air pollution
 No risk of fire
 Integration with district heating
 Containment of waste
 Intensive exploitation of solar energy through solar tracker tools
 No production of chemical or acoustic emissions
 Reuse of rainwater
 Reduction of at least 50% of water needed for irrigation of the field

Opening match
The stadium was opened during a match between Iran national under-20 football team and Foolad reserves team on 15 March 2012 which Iran U-20 won the match 4-2. The stadium was set to host the final match of 2011–12 Hazfi Cup but it was transferred to the Hafezieh Stadium in Shiraz.

See also
Foolad Arena
Takhti Stadium
Foolad
Football in Iran
List of association football stadia by capacity

References

External links

Foolad F.C.

Sports venues completed in 2012
Sport in Ahvaz
Football venues in Iran
Buildings and structures in Khuzestan Province